Zha Jie (born April 11, 1994) is a Chinese actor and model. He is best known for his role of prince Murong Li in the 2016 web series, Men with Sword.

Biography 
Zha Jie was born in Anhui, China on April 11, 1994. He attended and graduated from Hefei University and debuted as an actor in 2016, portraying the sly and vengeful prince Murong Li in the all-male web series Men with Sword. He repeated his role in a second season of the series, which was released on June 15, 2017. He also has appeared in web series like Pretty Man (as a guest), Little Brother Has a Demon, and Heaven Rule.

On April 11, 2017, he debuted as a singer with the release of his first single, He Qiu. On April 25, he won an Annual Newcomer Award, an award given annually to the best new artist. In 2018, he starred in the web movie The Deep Palace Honey.

Filmography

Web series

Movies

References

External links 

 Official web site

1994 births
Living people
Chinese male television actors
Chinese male film actors
21st-century Chinese male actors
Male actors from Anhui